The following is a timeline of the history of the city of Jaén, Spain.

Before 20th century

 1002 - Baños árabes de Jaén (bath) constructed.
 1225 - Siege of Jaén (1225).
 1230 - Siege of Jaén (1230) by Castilian forces.
 1245 - Siege of Jaén (1245–46) begins.

 1246 - Jaén becomes part of the Kingdom of Castile per the Treaty of Jaén.
 1248 - Roman Catholic Diocese of Jaén established.
 1712 - Earthquake.
 1724 - Jaén Cathedral consecrated.
 1727 - Iglesia de la Merced consecrated.
 1786 - Real Sociedad Económica de Amigos del País de la Ciudad y Reino de Jaén established.
 1813 - Diputación Provincial de Jaén founded.
 1833 - City becomes part of the newly formed Province of Jaén.
 1842 - Population: 17,387.
 1895
 Jaén Public Library established.
 Palacio Provincial de Jaén built.
 1900 - Population: 26,434.

20th century

 1901 -  (city hall) built (approximate date).
 1907 -  (theatre) opens.
 1922 - Real Jaén (football club) formed.
 1927 -  (theatre) built.
 1937 - 1 April: Bombing of Jaén by German forces.
 1940 - Population: 54,631.
 1941 -  newspaper begins publication.
 1944 - Estadio de la Victoria (stadium) opens.
 1949 -  (bus depot) built.
 1958 - Premio Jaén piano competition begins.
 1960 - Plaza de Toros de Jaén (bullring) built.
 1969 -  (museum) established.
 1988 -  built.
 1989 -  (church) built.
 1990 -  (museum) opens.
 1991
  opens.
 Population: 107,413
 1993 - University of Jaén established.

21st century

 2001 - Nuevo Estadio de La Victoria (stadium) opens.
 2002 -  (railway) construction begins.
 2005 -  theatre festival begins.
 2008 -  (theatre) opens.
 2011
 Jaén Tram begins operating.
 Population: 116,469.
 2015 -  becomes mayor.

See also
 
 
 List of municipalities in Jaén province
 Timelines of other cities in the autonomous community of Andalusia: Almería, Cádiz, Córdoba, Granada, Jerez de la Frontera, Málaga, Seville

References

This article incorporates information from the Spanish Wikipedia.

Bibliography

External links

 Items related to Jaén, various dates (via Europeana)

Jaén, Spain
Jaen